The Final Separation is the second album by the Italian thrash/black metal band Bulldozer, released in February 1986.

Track listing
All songs by AC Wild & Andy Panigada

Band members
A.C. Wild - vocals and bass
Andy Panigada - guitar 
Don Andras - drums, vocals on "Don" Andras

Production
Ivan Facchin - engineering
Nicola Calgari - engineering
Tony Magrini - photography

References

1987 albums
Bulldozer (band) albums
Roadrunner Records albums